Konfesse  is a village in the Bimah Prefecture in the Kara Region  of north-eastern Togo.

References

Populated places in Kara Region
Bimah Prefecture